Provincial Road 290 (also known as PR 290 or Highway 290) is a provincial road within the town limits of Gillam in the Canadian province of Manitoba. PR 290 begins at an intersection with Manitoba Provincial Road 280 in Jacam and heads to the northeast towards the abandoned town of Sundance. Most of PR 290's length is in a dense forest in northern Manitoba.

Route description 

PR 290 begins at an intersection with Road 280 just east of Stephens Lake. The highway crosses through dense forests for much of its length, passing forests roads on its way north. PR 290 turns to the east and heads along the river that leads into Stephens Lake. This river parallels PR 290 for the whole distance afterwards. The highway continues, turning to the northeast towards the abandoned town of Sundance. Route 290 curves to the northwest and heads towards downtown Sundance.

PR 290 intersects with a local road that begins to climb a mountain, where it enters downtown Sundance. The highway terminates ends about 27 kilometers from Sundance where there are service trailers by the river shore.

History 
PR 290 originally led to the abandoned town of Sundance. Sundance was organized in the 1980s with portable trailers for people building the Limestone Dam in northern Manitoba. PR 290 was assigned to a spur off PR 280 in 1989, running from PR 280 to Sundance. The trailers made up the elementary school, a few stores, a community center and several homes. The town has been abandoned, and only empty lots and roads remain.

Major intersections

External links

References 

290